

Events
Owney Madden, a mob leader and speakeasy owner, leaves New York City. Madden's departure follows several years of police surveillance after the shooting death of renegade mobster Vincent "Mad Dog" Coll.  Madden later settles in Hot Springs, Arkansas, establishing gambling operations there and forming political attachments through his hotel operation.
Gunman Joseph "Joey Doves" Aiuppa joins the Chicago Outfit to help protect their criminal operations in Cicero, Illinois.
January 30 – Frank Milano, former boss of the Cleveland crime syndicate, flees the United States for Mexico. Milano is succeeded by Alfred "Big Al" Polizzi.
March – Salvatore Sabella is arrested, convicted, and imprisoned for three months for illegally distilling alcohol in Montgomery County, Pennsylvania.
April – Tri-State Gang member Francis Wiley is convicted of the 1934 kidnap-murder of Philadelphia racketeer William Weiss. Tri-State Gang leaders Walter Legenza and Robert Mais had previously been convicted of murder and executed in Richmond, Virginia in February.
July 16 – "Lupo the Wolf" Ignazio Saietta is charged with extortion.  Saietta had been intimidating Italian bakers into joining  a local New York labor union he controlled.
July 25 – George Musey, associate boss of the Downtown Gang, is assassinated by the Maceo Crime Syndicate. 
August 22 – Vincenzo Troia, Sicilian mafiosi and associate of former "boss of all bosses" Salvatore Maranzano, is gunned down.  Troia was reportedly conspiring to assume control of the Newark-based New Jersey crime syndicate.
September 9 – Abraham Weinberg, a lieutenant of Dutch Schultz, disappears and is presumed murdered. Weinberg had been running Shultz's organization since Shultz went into hiding in 1933. Reportedly, Weinberg had been secretly negotiating with syndicate leaders Charles Luciano and Louis Buchalter.  Schultz may have murdered Weinberg after returning to power.
October 23 – After threatening the life of New York State prosecutor Thomas Dewey, Dutch Schultz is murdered along with Otto Berman, Lulu Rosencrantz and Abraham Landau at the Palace Chophouse in Newark, New Jersey.  The hit is reportedly conducted by Albert Anastasia's crew on orders from Lucky Luciano's National Crime Syndicate. Shultz's criminal operations are subsequently taken over by Vito Genovese with the help of lieutenant Michael "Trigger Mike" Coppola.
October 23 – Martin "Little Marty" Krompier, premier enforcer and lieutenant of Dutch Schultz's policy operations in Harlem, is severely wounded by rival gunmen.  This attack comes just hours after Schultz and his other associates are gunned down in Newark. Krompier ultimately survives the attack.

Arts and literature
'G' Men (film)  starring James Cagney.
The Petrified Forest (broadway play written by Robert E. Sherwood) starring Humphrey Bogart.

Deaths
Walter Legenza, co-leader of the Tri-State Gang
Robert Mais, co-leader of the Tri-State Gang
August 22 – Vincenzo Troia, Sicilian mafiosi and associate of Salvatore Maranzano
September 9 – Abraham 'Bo' Weinberg, Dutch Schultz lieutenant
October 23 – Dutch Schultz (Arthur Flegenheimer), New York Prohibition mobster and member of the National Crime Syndicate
October 23 – Otto Berman, financial consultant of Dutch Schultz
October 23 – Abraham Landau, Dutch Schultz gunman
October 23 – Lulu Rosencrantz, Dutch Schultz gunman

Years in organized crime
Organized crime